John Gaffney is a Scottish actor.

Life and career
John Gaffney was born in Hamilton in Scotland and moved to the island of Jersey in 1983. It was here where he got a taste for acting after being approached to take on a stage role by a local theatre director whilst singing in a night club. Upon returning to Scotland in 1992, Gaffney was offered a place on an acting course at the prestigious Royal Conservatoire of Scotland (formally the Royal Scottish Academy of Music and Drama) but family commitments forced him to decline the opportunity and instead decided to return to his trade as a plasterer.

It was 1994 that Gaffney first stepped in front of the camera to take on the role of an abusive father in the short "Garys Day Out" for director Steve Pang, A semi autobiographical on Pang himself, An Emotional journey for Pang.
In 2008, Gaffney returned to acting with small parts in short films including R.E.M, Hush, and A Spanking in Paradise. In 2011 he landed his first major role, starring as Dougie Fallon in the independently made television series The Crews. Starring alongside David Hayman and Stephen McCole, Gaffney's character Fallon was a high level member of a drug-dealing gang in Glasgow who has risen through the ranks of the criminal underworld. Despite a successful first series, the programme failed to find a buyer amongst the television studios including STV and BBC Scotland. The following year, Gaffney landed the role of Superintendent Charles Sloan in the feature Sci Fi film Night is Day. The film tells the story of Jason McKenzie, a vigilante super hero operating in Glasgow fighting crime whilst Sloan attempts to dismiss McKenzies existence and silence all tales of the real-life superhero. The film premiered at the 2012 edition of the Glasgow Film Festival.

Starring opposite Duncan Airlie James, 2013 saw Gaffney star as Liverpudlian gangster called Butler in the short film The Priest with Two Guns. The character, known as 'Butler the Bookie' is owed money by the brother of Father O'Reilly (played by James) who is being held hostage until the debt is repaid. The film picked up the Grand Jury Prize at the 2014 Amsterdam Film Festival. In the same year, Gaffney also made appearances in the short films V for Visa and "Doug And Steves Big Holy Adventure" by John McPhail and Blink by Colin Ross Smith.

In 2014, Gaffney was approached by Andy S. McEwan to play the role of Tam in the short comedy film Broken Record. The film saw Gaffney star as part of a comedy duo with Steven Patrick where they played a couple of house clearance workers in the 1990s who think they have stumbled upon hidden treasure in the form of old gramophone records. The film was widely praised by critics in both the United Kingdom and the United States. Josh Samford of RogueCinema wrote:  Fred McNamara of ScreenRelish also added:  The film later appeared in a number of British film festivals including the Loch Ness Film Festival in Inverness and the Portobello Film Festival in London. Later that year, Gaffney was recommended by Chris Quick to director Johnny Herbin who was casting for his short film Electric Faces. Quick, a producer on the film, suggested Gaffney was an ideal candidate to play the part of Lucas after working with him on the set of Broken Record. Herbin agreed with the decision and Gaffney was cast in the role and began filming his scenes in the summer of 2014. The film is due for release in 2015. He will also appear in Where Do We Go From Here, the first feature film of Scottish director John McPhail.

Filmography

Film

Television

Stage

Awards

References

External links

Scottish male film actors
Living people
Year of birth missing (living people)
Scottish male television actors
Scottish male stage actors